The baurua was a traditional sailing proa of the Gilbert Islands. They are considered to have been the most sophisticated of the Austronesian sailing vessels. A 100-foot baurua was built in 1939.

See also
List of multihulls
Wa (watercraft)

References

Multihulls
Gilbert Islands